Michiana is a region on the Indiana/Michigan border in the U.S.

Michiana may also refer to:

Places
 Michiana, Michigan
 Michiana Shores, Indiana
 Michiana County, the name that Cass County, Michigan, chose to rename itself in its failed proposal to join Indiana: See

Other
 Michiana Parkway